Jorethang is a major town in Namchi district in the Indian state of Sikkim.  Jorethang lies on the bank of Rangeet River, which is a tributary of the Teesta River, on the way to Pelling from Darjeeling, Siliguri and Kalimpong.

Demographics

As of the 2011 Census of India, Jorethang had a population of 9,009. Males constitute 52% of the population and females 48%. Jorethang has an average literacy rate of 88.85%, higher than the state average of 81.42%: male literacy is 93.36%, and female literacy is 84.20%. In Jorethang, 10.63% of the population is under 6 years of age.

Education 
Schools in Jorethang offer primary, secondary and senior secondary education. There are various school like New Buds Academy, St. Francis' School, Little Angles Academy, Govt. Sen.  Sec. School.

Maghe Sankranti Mela 
This festival is held on the first of Magh in the Bikram Samwat Nepali calendar (about 14 January), marking the sun's entrance into Makara rashi (Capricorn). It is one of the main festivals celebrated by the Nepali community in Sikkim dating from 1961.

References

External links

Jorethang Nagar Panchayat website

Cities and towns in Namchi district